Puff-puff, as it is called in Nigeria, is a traditional African snack made of fried dough. 

Puff-puffs are made of dough containing flour, yeast, sugar, butter, salt, water and eggs (which are optional), and deep fried in vegetable oil to a golden brown color. Baking powder can be used in place of yeast, but yeast is more common. After frying, puff puffs can be rolled in sugar. Like the French beignet and the Italian zeppole, puff-puffs can be rolled in any spice or flavoring such as cinnamon, vanilla and nutmeg. They may be served with a fruit dip such as strawberry or raspberry. Cameroonians accompany puff-puffs with beans.

Other names 
Other names for the food include buffloaf (or bofrot) in Ghana, botokoin in Togo, gato in Guinea and Mali, bofloto in the Ivory Coast, mikate in Congo, micate or bolinho in Angola, beignet in french or camfranglais in Cameroon, legemat in Sudan, kala in Liberia, and vetkoek, amagwinya, or magwinya in South Africa and Zimbabwe. The prominence of this food stretches even to the southern and eastern edges of Africa, where it is mostly known as mandazi.

See also

 Boortsog
 Buñuelo
 Chin chin
 Gulab jamun
 Kuli-kuli
 List of doughnut varieties
 Loukoumades
 Oliebol

References

Further reading
 
 

Nigerian cuisine
Sudanese cuisine
Ghanaian cuisine
Ivorian cuisine
Guinean cuisine
Togolese cuisine
Liberian cuisine
Democratic Republic of the Congo cuisine
Angolan cuisine
Cameroonian cuisine
Doughnuts